English singer Craig David has released eight studio albums, three compilation albums and fifty-two singles.

Albums

Studio albums

Compilation albums

Singles

As lead artist

As featured artist

Other charted songs

Other appearances

Songwriting credits

Remixes

Music videos

As lead artist

Guest appearances

References

Notes

Sources

Discographies of British artists
Rhythm and blues discographies